Garacharma is a census town in Andaman district of the Andaman and Nicobar Islands, a union territory of India.

Demographics
 India census, Garacharma had a population of 9,431. Males constitute 53% of the population and females 47%. Garacharma has an average literacy rate of 74%, higher than the national average of 59.5%: male literacy is 78%, and female literacy is 69%. In Garacharma, 12% of the population is under 6 years of age.

References

World Gazetteer: Garacharma (population)

Cities and towns in South Andaman district